Bennett-Arcane Long Camp was a 1849er camp set up in December 1849 in Death Valley as they traveled to the California Gold Rush. They were emigrants crossing the harsh desert to get to California. The camp was located just west of valley's Badwater Basin in present day Death Valley National Park. The Bennett-Arcane party became known as the Death Valley '49ers.
The Death Valley '49ers were pioneers from the Eastern United States travelling west to prospect in the Sutter's Fort area of the Central Valley and Sierra Nevada in California. The wagon train crossed Utah across the Great Basin Desert in Nevada. They made a wrong turn on got trapped in Death Valley. After exiting they crossed the Mojave Desert into Southern California. Still wanting to go to the California Gold Country. The group used the southern Desert part of the  Old Spanish Trail, after hearing about the death of the Donner Party.  Allegedly, the Bennett-Arcane group coined the name Death Valley.

The group was suffering from poor health and low provisions, and they were unable to continue over the Panamint Range. John Haney Rogers and William Lewis Manly walked 250 miles across the Mojave Desert to Rancho San Fernando near Los Angeles, California. They found a route out of the valley for those trapped in Death Valley. At Rancho San Fernando received food and horses from Mexican villagers to take back and save the party. The group then traveled to Rancho San Francisco.

The group had split up in the valley, the other group was the Jayhawkers, stay with their original plan of traveling west out of the valley. Both groups were stuck in the valley for a month and both saved from dying of thirst by a snow storm.

California Historical Landmark

A California Historical Marker was setup in 1965 by the California State Park Commission working with City of Calexico and the John P. Squibob with E Clampus Vitus. The marker is at the 400 Block of East 5th Street, Calexico. The California Historical Landmark number 808.

The California Historical Landmark reads:
NO. 444 BENNETT-ARCANE LONG CAMP - Near this spot the Bennett-Arcane contingent of the Death Valley '49ers, emigrants from the Middle West seeking a shortcut to California gold fields, were stranded for a month and almost perished from starvation. William Lewis Manley and John Rogers, young members of the party, made a heroic journey on foot to San Fernando and, returning with supplies, led the party to the safety of San Francisquito Rancho near Newhall.

See also

California Historical Landmarks in Inyo County
History of California through 1899

References

External links
 
California as I saw it, First Person Narratives of California 1849-1900, Collection, Rare Book and Collectors, The Library of Congress
Dedication of John Rogers monument in Merced by Death Valley 49's organization 
Tentative Census by Carl I. Wheat, of the 1849 Pioneers that crossed Death Valley

California Historical Landmarks
Death Valley